The National Farm and Home Hour is a variety show that was broadcast in various formats from 1928 to 1958. Aimed at listeners in rural America, it was known as "the farmer's bulletin board" and was produced by the United States Department of Agriculture with contributions from, and the cooperation of, various farm organizations (among them the American Farm Bureau, 4-H Club, Farmers Union, Future Farmers of America and the National Grange). Raymond Edward Johnson and, later, Don Ameche appeared in dramatic sketches in the role of the Forest Ranger.

With live coverage of livestock expositions, harvest festivals and "the most spectacular happenings in agricultural America," the program offered tips to farmers, music and news, plus advice from agencies and government officials. 

The series first aired on Pittsburgh's KDKA (1928-29), moving to the Blue Network (later ABC) from September 30, 1929, to March 17, 1945. Originating from WMAQ in Chicago, it was usually heard Monday through Saturday at 12:30 (Eastern). Under the sponsorship of Allis-Chalmers, it continued on NBC as a 30-minute show on Saturdays at noon (Eastern) from September 15, 1945 to January 25, 1958; in its final three years (1955-58), it would be incorporated into the Saturday lineup of NBC's weekend anthology Monitor.

Host Everett Mitchell opened each broadcast with his trademark line, "It's a beautiful day in Chicago!", which became a familiar catch phrase. He began using the introduction on May 14, 1932.

External links
Chicago Pages by Nemorino: "It's a beautiful day in Chicago!"
Nemorino recalls WMAQ studio broadcasts of The National Farm and Home Hour

References
 

American variety radio programs
National Farm and Home Hour, The
1958 radio programme endings
1920s American radio programs
1930s American radio programs
1940s American radio programs
1950s American radio programs
NBC Blue Network radio programs
ABC radio programs
Agriculture in the United States
Radio programs about agriculture